Rao Bahadur Mahadev Govind Ranade (18 January 1842 – 16 January 1901), popularly referred to as Justice Ranade, was an Indian scholar, social reformer, judge and author. He was one of the founding members of the Indian National Congress party and owned several designations as member of the Bombay legislative council, member of the finance committee at the centre, and judge of the Bombay High Court, Maharashtra.

As a well known public figure, his personality as a calm and patient optimist influenced his attitude towards dealings with Britain as well as reform in India.  During his life he helped to establish the Poona Sarvajanik Sabha, Maharashtra Granthottejak Sabha and the Prarthana Samaj, and edited a Bombay Anglo-Marathi daily paper, the Induprakash, founded on his ideology of social and religious reform.

He was given the title of Rao Bahadur.

Early life and family

Mahadev Govind Ranade was born into a Chitpavan Brahmin family in Niphad, a taluka town in Nashik district. He studied in a Marathi school in Kolhapur and later shifted to an English-medium school. At age 14, he studied at Elphinstone College, Bombay. He belonged to the first batch of students at the University of Bombay. In 1862, he obtained a B.A. degree in history & economics, and in 1864 a M.A. in history. Three years later, he obtained his L.L.B. in 1867.

Judge 
After getting his law degree (LLB) in 1866, Ranade became a subordinate judge in Pune in 1871. Given his political activities, the British colonial authorities delayed his promotion to the Bombay High Court until 1895.

Social activism 
Ranade was a social activist whose activities were deeply influenced by western culture and the colonial state. His activities ranged from religious reform to public education to reform within the Indian family, and in every area, he was prone to see little virtue in Indian custom and tradition and to strive for re-forming the subject into the mould of what prevailed in the west. He himself summarized the mission of the Indian Social Reform Movement as being to "Humanize, Equalize and Spiritualize," the implication being that existing Indian society lacked these qualities.

Prarthana Samaj 

His efforts to "Spiritualize" Indian society flowed from his reading that the Hindu religion laid too much stress on rituals and on the performance of family and social duties, rather than on what he called 'Spiritualism.' He viewed the reformed Christian religion of the British as being more focused on the spiritual. Towards making the Hindu religion more akin to the reformed Protestant church, he co-founded and championed the activities of the Prarthana Samaj, a religious society which, while upholding the devotional aspect of Hinduism, denounced and decried many important Hindu social structures and customs, including the Brahmin clergy.

Female Emancipation 
His efforts to "Humanize and Equalize" Indian society found its primary focus in women. He campaigned against the 'purdah system' (keeping women behind the veil). He was a founder of the Social Conference movement, which he supported till his death, directing his social reform efforts against child marriage, the tonsure of widows, the heavy cost of weddings and other social functions, and the caste restrictions on travelling abroad, and he strenuously advocated widow remarriage and female education. In 1861, when he was still a teenager, Ranade co-founded the 'Widow Marriage Association' which promoted marriage for Hindu widows and acted as native compradors for the colonial government's project of passing a law permitting such marriages. 
He chose to take prayaschitta (religious penance) in the Panch-houd Mission Case rather than insisting on his opinions.

Girls' education 
In 1885, Ranade along with Vaman Abaji Modak and historian Dr. R. G. Bhandarkar established the Maharashtra Girls Education Society to start Huzurpaga, the oldest girls' high school in Maharashtra.

Personal life

Ranade was already into his 30s when his first wife died. His family wanted him to marry again, especially since he had no children. His reform-minded friends expected that Ranade, who had co-founded the 'Widow Marriage Association' as far back as 1861, would certainly act in accordance with his own sermons and marry a widow. This did not happen. Ranade yielded to his family's wishes and conformed with convention to marry Ramabai, a girl who was barely eleven years old and who was fully twenty years younger than him. Indeed, Ramabai was born in 1862, nearly a year after Ranade had founded his 'Widow Marriage Association' in 1861. Ranade did what he did because he knew the realities of his society: he knew that if he married an already married woman, any children born to her would be treated like illegitimate outcasts by his society. The really poignant thing about the whole affair is that, after facing so much ridicule and so many accusations of hypocrisy, Ranade was not fated to receive the blessing he craved so ardently: his second marriage also remained childless.

In any case, the wedding was held in full compliance with tradition and the marriage was certainly a happy one. Ramabai was a daughter of the Kurlekar family, which belonged to the same caste and social strata as Ranade. The couple had an entirely harmonious and conventional marriage. Ranade ensured that his wife receive a high education, something about which she herself was initially not keen. However, like all Indian women of that era, she complied with her husband's wishes and grew into her new life. Indeed, after Ranade's death, Ramabai Ranade continued the social and educational reform work initiated by him.

Published works
 ; reprinted in 1999 as 
 .
 
 ; reprinted by CHIZINE PUBN as

In popular culture
A television series on Zee Marathi named Unch Majha Zoka (roughly translated as 'My Swing Flies High') based on Ramabai's and Mahadevrao's life and their development as a 'women's rights' activist was broadcast in March 2012. It was based on a book by Ramabai Ranade titled Amachyaa Aayushyaatil Kaahi Aathavani. In the book, Justice Ranade is called  "Madhav" rather than Mahadev. The series had actors Vikram Gaikwad as Mahadev Govind Ranade and Spruha Joshi as Ramabai Ranade..

See also

 Revolutionary movement for Indian independence
 List of Indian independence activists

Footnotes

References

Brown, D. Mackenzie. Indian Political Thought: From Ranade to Bhave. (Berkeley: University of California, 1961).
Mansingh, Surjit. Historical Dictionary of India. vol. 20, Asian Historical Dictionaries.  s.v. "Shivaji". (London: Scarecrow Press, 1996).
 Masselos, Jim. Indian Nationalism: A History. (New Delhi: Sterling Publishers, 1985).
 Wolpert, Stanley. India. (Berkeley: University of California, 1991). 57.
 Wolpert, Stanley. Tilak and Gokhale: Revolutions and Reform in the Making of Modern India. (Berkeley: University of California, 1962). 12.

1842 births
1901 deaths
Marathi people
Indian independence activists from Maharashtra
Indian independence activists
Companions of the Order of the Indian Empire
People from Nashik district
Judges of the Bombay High Court
Indian National Congress politicians from Maharashtra
Elphinstone College alumni
Indian social reformers
English-language writers from India
19th-century Indian judges
Writers from Maharashtra
Members of the Bombay Legislative Council
19th-century Indian historians
Prarthana Samaj
Presidents of the Akhil Bharatiya Marathi Sahitya Sammelan
Founders of Indian schools and colleges
People from Maharashtra